"So. Central Rain (I'm Sorry)" is a song by the American alternative rock band R.E.M. It was released in May 1984 as the first single from the group's second studio album Reckoning. 

R.E.M. performed a rough version of the song on the NBC television show Late Night with David Letterman on October 6, 1983—before the song had a title—in what was the band's first U.S. network television appearance.

Thom Yorke, of Radiohead, has commented that "So. Central Rain" is his favourite R.E.M. song.

Music video
The video, directed by Howard Libov, was filmed at the Reflection Studio in Charlotte, North Carolina during the recording of Reckoning, and first aired in June 1984. It featured the members of the band playing their instruments behind white screens (gobos) in an otherwise empty room, with Michael Stipe singing in the foreground. Stipe refused to lip sync to the song. Guitarist Peter Buck said, "We played a recording of the track, and the rest of us faked it, but Michael insisted on singing a new vocal to make it more real for him."

The song is also featured in the Left of Reckoning video shot by James Herbert.

Track listings
All songs written by Bill Berry, Peter Buck, Mike Mills, and Michael Stipe unless otherwise indicated.

7" Single
 "So. Central Rain (I'm Sorry)" – 3:16
 "Walter's Theme" / "King of the Road" (Roger Miller) – 4:44

12" single
 "So. Central Rain (I'm Sorry)" – 3:16
 "Voice of Harold" – 4:25
 "Pale Blue Eyes" (Lou Reed) – 2:54

Album
 "so. Central Rain" – 3:11{sic}

Notes:
 "Walter's Theme", "King of the Road", "Voice of Harold" and "Pale Blue Eyes" can all be found on Dead Letter Office.
 "Walter's Theme" is not listed on the cover.
 The album title-listing contains an initial lower-case 's', following a pattern in the album's listings where random capital letters are made lower-case and random lower-case letters are capitalized. The front cover art lists it as 'So CENTRAL RAiN', with '7 chineSe bros.' on the back track listings differing from the cover art as well.
 The album's inner sleeve lists the full title as "Southern Central Rain (I'm Sorry)".

Chart positions
"So. Central Rain (I'm Sorry)" became the second R.E.M. single to chart on the Billboard Hot 100, peaking at number 85.

References

External links
"So. Central Rain (I'm Sorry)" video at VH1 Classics.com

R.E.M. songs
1984 singles
Songs written by Bill Berry
Songs written by Peter Buck
Songs written by Mike Mills
Songs written by Michael Stipe
I.R.S. Records singles
Songs based on actual events
Song recordings produced by Don Dixon (musician)
Song recordings produced by Mitch Easter
1984 songs